AliveCor is a medical device and AI company producing ECG hardware and software for consumer mobile devices. The company was the first to receive FDA-clearance for a medical-device accessory to the Apple Watch. The company's primary product is the AliveCor KardiaMobile, a portable ECG device that can be used to detect atrial fibrillation (AFib) and other cardiac conditions. AliveCor was founded in 2010 and is headquartered in Mountain View, California, the United States.

History 
The company was co-founded by David Albert, a medical doctor and former chief clinical scientist of cardiology at General Electric, along with scientists Bruce Satchwell and Kim Barnett. Albert began working on ECGs for handheld computers in 1990, when the first palm top computer was released by Hewlett-Packard. He received a 1998 patent, along with Satchwell and Barnett, for wireless transmission of ECGs in handheld devices.

In December 2010, Albert demonstrated a prototype of an iPhone ECG through a YouTube video. After the video received attention from the media, Albert was approached by venture capitalists and industry partners to fund the new company. AliveCor received its first $3 million in financing in 2011.

An FDA-approved smart-phone case that works as an ECG was released by AliveCor in 2012.  AliveCor ran two clinical trials to test the hardware and the app. The first study investigated how its single-lead ECG compared to a traditional 12-lead device. The second study looked at whether 54 participants with no medical training could determine how to work the phone case. The latter study passed FDA clearance and led to the diagnosis of two serious heart conditions.

The company later released a credit-card sized device. The device required placing fingertips on its sensors for 30 seconds to get a medical-grade ECG reading. The data was sent to the cloud where it could be read by physicians.

While its first ECG devices relied on doctors to analyze the readings, in 2015, the company received multiple clearances by the FDA to offer algorithmic analysis of readings to determine certain heart rhythm problems.

By 2017, the company's software was using neural networks to "train" its products to detect heart problems. The network uses four convolutional layers, with two tied to 300,000 parameters, and takes about seven minutes to train on a new user. After about a month of product use, the software builds a heart profile of the specific user, a data-driven model that can detect problems, including how the electrical system within a heart is firing.

AliveCor had recorded about 20 million ECGs by November 2017.

By the end of 2017, the FDA had cleared the KardiaBand ECG reader as a medical device accessory to the Apple Watch. The KardiaBand had been approved for use in Europe earlier in the year. A study by the Cleveland Clinic showed the KardiaBand could distinguish between atrial fibrillation and a normal heart rhythm with 93 percent sensitivity and 94 percent specificity; sensitivity increased to 99 percent with physician review of the reading. 

In 2017, the company was conducting research with Columbia University and the Mayo Clinic to determine if the KardiaBand can identify early warning signs of Long QT syndrome, a cause of sudden death, especially in young people.

AliveCor presented research in March 2018 that it conducted with the Mayo Clinic showing that the KardiaBand can detect hyperkalemia, elevated levels of potassium in the blood, with 90% to 94% accuracy. Existing tests for the condition require laboratory blood tests.  To create the detection method, a dataset with 2 million ECGs linked to 4 million serum potassium values, collected over 23 years, was analysed using artificial intelligence (AI). The company said it would pursue clinical trials and FDA-clearance for the detection method.

As of 2021, AliveCor products had been tested in about 160 clinical studies published in peer-reviewed journals.

Fast Company ranked AliveCor number one in artificial intelligence in its 2018 list of the "World's Most Innovative Companies."

In 2019, the company ended sales of the KardiaBand ECG reader.

Leadership 
The company hired former Google and Microsoft executive Vic Gundotra as its CEO in November 2016. Gundotra subsequently hired two senior Google engineers to run hardware and software for Alivecor. Frank Petterson, an engineering lead at YouTube, became VP of engineering. Simon Prakash, a senior director at Google's hardware unit, became VP of products and design. In February 2018, founding CEO Vic Gundotra left the company and Ira Bahr was appointed as interim CEO. Priya Abani, formerly the general manager and director of Alexa at Amazon, was hired as the new CEO in July 2019.

In March 2020, AliveCor announced the appointment of Siva Somayajula, a former Director of Product Software and Services for consumer electronics at Amazon, as its Chief Technology Officer.

Products

The company provides a smartphone-connected ECG recorder known as KardiaMobile for personal use. The user places their fingertips on a chewing gum-stick sized device for about 30 seconds and the results are sent to the user's smartphone. The results can be read by the user and also e-mailed to a physician. It was cleared by the FDA in 2012 for detecting atrial fibrillation and normal sinus rhythm.

A professional product k provides medical professionals with the ability to monitor their patients using Kardia devices. Doctors are alerted when a patient's device detects an abnormality. KardiaPro also tracks patient risk factors, including weight, activity and blood pressure and analyzes them with Artificial Intelligence to alert doctors to potential issues.
The company formerly offered a wristband ECG reader marketed as KardiaBand, for the Apple Watch. It was used to detect atrial fibrillation, approved by the FDA in 2017. The device's software was intended to use artificial intelligence to analyze data from the built-in heart-rate sensor and accelerometer to spot unexpected patterns. Unusual patterns prompted the user to take a 30-second ECG on the device by touching a wristband sensor. Sales of the KardiaBand ended in 2019, after later generations of the Apple Watch incorporated built-in ECG sensors.

The KardiaMobile 6L is an FDA-cleared personal 6-lead ECG device. The products are intended to detect three of the most common arrhythmias: atrial fibrillation, bradycardia, tachycardia, as well as normal heart rhythm. The company provides a subscription service which provides paying customers with access to additional features and detections. The additional leads from the KardiaMobile 6L allow physicians to see detailed information on a patient's ECG recording.

Aside from human ECG devices, Alivecor manufactures a veterinary heart monitor used for collecting ECG data in goats and horses.

Financing
In 2020, AliveCor raised $65 million in series E funding led by Omron with Khosla Ventures, WP Global Partners, Qualcomm Ventures and Bold Capital Partners. This follows the raising $30 million in funding from medical-device maker Omron and the Mayo Clinic in 2017. Previous investors include Burrill Life Sciences Capital. Kearny Partners and Oklahoma Life Science are also investors.

See also 

 Wireless ambulatory ECG
 OrCam device
 Vacuactivus

References

Medical device manufacturers
Medical technology companies of the United States